Diacrisia nebulosa is a moth in the family Erebidae. It was described by Arthur Gardiner Butler in 1877. It is found in the Russian Far East (southern Primorye, Kunashir), China (Dunbei, Inner Mongolia), Japan and possibly Korea.

The species of the genus Rhyparioides, including this one, were moved to Diacrisia as a result of phylogenetic research published by Rönkä et al. in 2016.

References

Arctiidae genus list at Butterflies and Moths of the World of the Natural History Museum

Moths described in 1861
Arctiina